Yvonne Gebauer (born ) is a German politician of the Free Democratic Party (FDP) who served as the State Minister for School and Education of North Rhine-Westphalia from 2017 to 2022. She was active in the local politics of her home city Cologne before being elected to the State Parliament of North Rhine-Westphalia in 2012. She has served on her party's state board since 2016.

Early life 
Gebauer was born on 2 August 1966 in Cologne. Her father was Wolfgang Leirich, a one-time leader of the Free Democratic Party (FDP) in her hometown. Having obtained her Abitur in 1985, she studied to become a clerk at a law firm and worked in this job until 1989. From 1989 until 1992, she worked on the staff of a Member of the German Bundestag. She managed a city-run accommodation facility.

Political career 
Having joined the FDP in 1982, Gebauer was elected to Cologne's city council in 2004, a position she held until 2012. In the 2012 North Rhine-Westphalia state election, she won a seat in the Landtag of North Rhine-Westphalia via her party's list and specialised in the politics of education. From 2015 to 2017, while serving as member of parliament, she served as the chairwoman of the FDP in Cologne. 

Gebauer has been part of her party's leadership in North Rhine-Westphalia since 2016, under successive chairs Christian Lindner (2016–2017) and Joachim Stamp (2017–2023). 

On 30 June 2017, Gebauer was appointed State Minister for School and Education in the governments of Ministers-President of North Rhine-Westphalia Armin Laschet and Hendrik Wüst. In the negotiations to form a so-called traffic light coalition of the Social Democratic Party (SPD), the Green Party and the FDP following the 2021 German elections, she was part of her party's delegation in the working group on education policy, co-chaired by Andreas Stoch, Felix Banaszak and Jens Brandenburg.

Gebauer was replaced by  after the 2022 North Rhine-Westphalia state election.

Personal life 
Gebauer has one son.

References

Bibliography 

Living people
1966 births
Politicians from Cologne
Free Democratic Party (Germany) politicians
Members of the Landtag of North Rhine-Westphalia
21st-century German women politicians